The 1971 Tangerine Bowl was held on December 28, 1971, at the Tangerine Bowl stadium in Orlando, Florida. The Toledo Rockets of the Mid-American Conference defeated the Richmond Spiders of the Southern Conference by a score of 28–3. The Tangerine Bowl is a former name of what is now called the Citrus Bowl.

Heading into the game, Toledo had an unblemished 11–0 record. They were MAC champions and were ranked #14 in the AP Poll. The Toledo Rockets were heavy favorites; they were riding a 34-game winning streak and attempting to finish their third straight undefeated and untied season in a row. Their nationally ranked defense, led by All-American Mel Long, helped the Rockets outgain the Spiders 395–138 in total yards. Toledo finished #14 in the season's final AP Poll.

Richmond entered with a 5–6 record. They were Southern Conference champions after they defeated William & Mary, 21–19, in the regular season finale to clinch the conference title. The Spiders were appearing in their second-ever postseason bowl game; their first had been the 1968 Tangerine Bowl.

Scoring summary

References

Tangerine Bowl
Citrus Bowl (game)
Toledo Rockets football bowl games
Richmond Spiders football bowl games
Tangerine Bowl
Tangerine Bowl